Tynemouth and North Shields was a parliamentary borough constituency represented in the House of Commons of the Parliament of the United Kingdom between 1832 and 1885. It elected one Member of Parliament (MP) by the first-past-the-post system of election.

Boundaries
The seat was created by the Reform Act 1832 under the name of Tynemouth. However, in the Parliamentary Boundaries Act 1832, it is referred to as Tynemouth and North Shields.

The constituency was based upon the communities of Tynemouth and North Shields, in the part of the historic county of Northumberland which has, since 1974, been part of the metropolitan borough of North Tyneside in Tyne and Wear. Under the Boundaries Act, its contents were defined as:The several Townships of Tynemouth, North Shields, Chirton, Preston and Cullercoats.Tynemouth was incorporated as a municipal borough in 1849 under the Municipal Corporations Act 1835.  The borough covered the whole area east of Wallsend and south of Whitley Bay, including the less historic but more economically significant town of North Shields as well as smaller villages such as New York and Cullercoats.

Although there is no formal reference to Tynemouth and North Shields in the Redistribution of Seats Act 1885, it became known as Tynemouth from that time. There was no change to the boundaries.

Members of Parliament

Supplemental Note:-
 1 F. W. S. Craig, in his compilations of election results for Great Britain, classifies Whig, Radical and similar candidates as Liberals from 1832. The name Liberal was gradually adopted as a description for the Whigs and politicians allied with them, before the formal creation of the Liberal Party shortly after the 1859 general election.

Elections

Elections in the 1830s

 On petition, Young was unseated and Grey was declared elected

Elections in the 1840s

Elections in the 1850s

Taylor's election was declared void on petition due to bribery and treating, causing a by-election.

Elections in the 1860s
Taylor's resignation caused a by-election.

Elections in the 1870s

Elections in the 1880s

See also
List of former United Kingdom Parliament constituencies
History of parliamentary constituencies and boundaries in Northumberland

References 

 British Parliamentary Election Results 1832-1885, compiled and edited by F.W.S. Craig (The Macmillan Press 1977)
 Who's Who of British Members of Parliament: Volume I 1832-1885, edited by M. Stenton (The Harvester Press 1976)

Parliamentary constituencies in Tyne and Wear (historic)
Parliamentary constituencies in Northumberland (historic)
Constituencies of the Parliament of the United Kingdom established in 1832
Constituencies of the Parliament of the United Kingdom disestablished in 1885